USS Harold J. Ellison (DE-545) was a proposed World War II United States Navy John C. Butler-class destroyer escort that was never completed.

Harold J. Ellisons keel was laid at the Boston Navy Yard in Boston, Massachusetts.  However, her construction was cancelled on 10 June 1944 before she could be launched. The incomplete ship was scrapped.

The name Harold J. Ellison was reassigned to the destroyer USS Harold J. Ellison (DD-864).

References

Navsource Naval History: Photographic History of the U.S. Navy: Destroyer Escorts, Frigates, Littoral Warfare Vessels

John C. Butler-class destroyer escorts
Cancelled ships of the United States Navy
Ships built in Boston